is a Japanese football player who currently plays for Júbilo Iwata.

Career
Kotaro Fujikawa joined J1 League club Júbilo Iwata in 2017.

Club statistics
Updated to 22 February 2019.

References

External links
Profile at Jubilo Iwata

1998 births
Living people
Association football people from Fukuoka Prefecture
Japanese footballers
J1 League players
J2 League players
J3 League players
Júbilo Iwata players
Roasso Kumamoto players
Giravanz Kitakyushu players
Association football midfielders